Charteris is a Scottish surname.  Notable people with the surname include: 

 Thomas Charteris (d. 1346), Scottish nobleman and ambassador to England 
 Archibald Hamilton Charteris (1835-1908), Scottish theologian, founder of Life and Work magazine
 Francis Charteris (disambiguation)
 Henry Charteris, principal of Edinburgh University from 1599 to 1620 
 Hugo Charteris, 11th Earl of Wemyss (1857–1937)
 David Charteris, 12th Earl of Wemyss (1912–2008)
 John Charteris (1877-1946), British army officer
 Leslie Charteris (1907-1993), British author, creator of "The Saint" Simon Templar 
 Ann Charteris (1913-1981), wife of British author Ian Fleming
 Martin Charteris, Baron Charteris of Amisfield (1913-1999), private secretary to HM Elizabeth II
 James Charteris, 13th Earl of Wemyss (b. 1948)
 Luke Charteris (b. 1983), Welsh rugby player

See also
 Clan Charteris 

Scottish surnames